Children of the Dragon (alternatively titled Sign Of The Snake) is a 1992 UK-Australian drama serial set against the background of the 1989 Tiananmen Square uprising.

It was shot at the ABC Frenchs Forest Studios and at the Sydney Showground.

References

External links

Australian television films